Karl Storch (21 August 1913 – 16 August 1992) was a German athlete, who mainly competed in the hammer throw. He was born in Fulda.

The member of SC Borussia Fulda competed for Germany in the 1952 Summer Olympics held in Helsinki, Finland in the hammer throw where he won the silver medal (invalid - 56,45m - 58,18m - 58,86m - 57,80m - 58,38m).

The coal dealer, father of four daughters, stood 1,84m, with a weight of 110 kg in competition.

Karl Storch was awarded the Rudolf Harbig-Gedächtnispreis in 1954.

References

1913 births
1992 deaths
German male hammer throwers
Olympic silver medalists for Germany
Athletes (track and field) at the 1952 Summer Olympics
Olympic athletes of Germany
Medalists at the 1952 Summer Olympics
Olympic silver medalists in athletics (track and field)
People from Fulda
Sportspeople from Kassel (region)